On the House is a British television comedy which aired from 1970 to 1971. Cast included Kenneth Connor, John Junkin, John Normington, Tommy Godfrey, Gordon Rollings, Derek Griffiths, Peter Atard, and Robin Askwith. It was produced by Yorkshire Television, and despite the wiping that was common during the early 1970s, all the episodes are still in existence.

References

External links
On the House on IMDb

1970 British television series debuts
1971 British television series endings
English-language television shows
ITV sitcoms
1970s British sitcoms
Television series by Yorkshire Television